The Samoa national under-21 netball team is the highest youth team of netball for Samoa and represents Samoa at the Netball World Youth Cup. It is controlled by the Samoa Netball Association.

History

In 2012 the team appointed Trish Wilcox as coach for the 2013 Youth World Championships.

In September 2016 the team qualified for the 2017 Netball World Youth Cup in Gaborone, Botswana. As preparation for the world cup the team also contested the Digicel Punjas International Youth Netball Series. It announced its world cup team in May 2017 coming eleventh. 

In 2020 the Covid-19 pandemic forced cancellation of the Oceania qualifying tournament for the 2021 world cup, and Samoa qualified on the basis of its world ranking. Head coach Frances Solia began "virtual trials" to select players. In October 2020 it announced a 22-player "long squad" of potential players, from which the final 12-player squad would be selected. The delay in the competition saw a new squad selected in January 2021. The competition was subsequently cancelled due to the pandemic.

Players

2021 Netball World Youth Cup long squad

References

Netball in Samoa
National netball teams of Oceania
Netball U-21